K3 Radio Prnjavor or K3 Radio is a Bosnian local commercial radio station, broadcasting from Prnjavor, Bosnia and Herzegovina. This radio station broadcasts a variety of programs such as music and local news. The owner of the radio station is the company Televizija K3 d.o.o. Prnjavor which also operates television channel TV K3.

After BHRT has abandoned the launch of the BH Radio 2 program, reserved frequencies were allocated to other interested stations across Bosnia and Herzegovina through the competition where television TV K3 met the criteria for K3 Radio which was established in 2020.

Program of is mainly produced in Serbian language at 5 FM frequencies and it is available in the Prnjavor, Kotor Varoš, Lopare, Sarajevo and Istočno Sarajevo area.

Frequencies
 Doboj  
 Lopare 	
 Istočno Sarajevo 
 Pale  
 Kotor Varoš

See also 
 List of radio stations in Bosnia and Herzegovina
 Radio Prnjavor
 Radio Mix
 Radio Tuzla
 Radio Tešanj

References

External links 
 www.tvk3.info
 www.radiostanica.ba
 www.fmscan.org
 Communications Regulatory Agency of Bosnia and Herzegovina

Prnjavor
Radio stations established in 2020
Mass media in Bijeljina
Mass media in Sarajevo